Pedro Muñoz de la Torre (born October 19, 1966, in Torreón, Coahuila) is a Mexican football manager and former player.

External links
 

1966 births
Living people
Association football defenders
Mexican football managers
Santos Laguna footballers
Irapuato F.C. footballers
Liga MX players
Ascenso MX players
Footballers from Coahuila
Mexican footballers
Sportspeople from Torreón